The by-election for Sydenham in 1886 was a by-election held during the 9th Parliament of New Zealand on 12 May 1886 in the  electorate. It was held because William White resigned his seat in March 1886 on medical advice. Richard Molesworth Taylor won the by-election against John Lee Scott, Samuel Paull Andrews and S. G. Jolly.

Results

References

Sydenham 1886
1886 elections in New Zealand
Sydenham